Free Dadra and Nagar Haveli was a de facto state that existed in the Indian Sub-continent between 1954 and 1961. It was declared by pro-India forces that had gained control of the region from Portugal in 1954 and ceased to exist after being formally annexed by India on 11 August 1961 as the Union Territory of Dadra and Nagar Haveli.

History

Dadra and Nagar Haveli were small Portuguese overseas territories that had been part of Portuguese India since 1779. They were administered by a Portuguese Governor based in nearby Daman. Following Indian independence in 1947, they were completely surrounded by sovereign territory belonging to India.

On 22 July 1954, pro-India forces took control of the main police station in Dadra. They would proceed to take control of Naroli on 22 July and Silvassa on 2 August at which point the region was declared to be liberated from Portuguese rule and assumed the name "Free Dadra and Nagar Haveli". A body called the Varishta Panchayat of Free Dadra and Nagar Haveli was formed to administer the territory. The Indian National Flag was hoisted in Silvassa and the Indian national anthem was sung, becoming the symbols of the state.

In June 1961, the Varishta Panchayat of Free Dadra and Nagar Haveli voted to accede to India. An Indian civil servant, K.G. Badlani would assume the title “Prime Minister of Free Dadra and Nagar Haveli” on 11 August 1961 in order to formally sign an Instrument of Accession allowing annexation by India to take place. Free Dadra and Nagar Haveli was annexed by India on 11 August 1961 by virtue of the Tenth Amendment of the Constitution of India, becoming the Union Territory of Dadra and Nagar Haveli.

Portugal refused to recognise the loss of Dadra and Nagar Haveli and continued to claim Dadra and Nagar Haveli as part of Portuguese India and they were still recognised internationally (e.g., by the International Court of Justice) as Portuguese possessions. Portugal formally recognised Indian sovereignty over the area on 31 December 1974 following the Carnation revolution.

Government and politics
After Dadra and Nagar Haveli was declared liberated from Portuguese rule, a body called the Varishta Panchayat of Free Dadra and Nagar Haveli was formed to administer the region. The administration of Free Dadra and Nagar Haveli was also supported by civil servants from the Indian Administrative Service.

Postal history
Mail from Free Dadra and Nagar Haveli was routed through the Indian town of Vapi close to the border. Initially, remaining stocks of stamps of Portuguese India were overprinted LIBERATED AREAS in two lines. A single revenue stamp was also issued by Free Dadra and Nagar Haveli.

References

Dadra and Nagar Haveli
Indian independence movement
Former unrecognized countries
Former countries
Former countries in Asia
States and territories established in 1954
States and territories disestablished in 1961
Former countries in South Asia